Sakura Tameike is an earthfill dam located in Tottori prefecture in Japan. The dam is used for irrigation. The catchment area of the dam is 0.3 km2. The dam impounds about 8  ha of land when full and can store 546 thousand cubic meters of water. The construction of the dam was completed in 1973.

References

Dams in Tottori Prefecture
1973 establishments in Japan